Joseph A. Rosen (born: Joseph Borisovich Rosen, 1877, Moscow — 1949, New York), an American agronomist of Russian origin, was head of the Russian branch of the Joint and  head of Agro-Joint from 1924 to 1938.

Biography 
Born in Moscow. His father was the owner of a dye-house in Tula. Studied at Moscow University. Sentenced to exile in Siberia for participating in a revolutionary group. He was a member of the Russian Social Democratic Labour Party within the Menshevik fraction. At the age of 17, he fled from exile to Germany. Studied at the agricultural department of the Heidelberg University.

In 1903 he emigrated to the US and worked in agriculture for two years. In 1905-1908 he continued his education at the Michigan Agricultural College, where he received the degree of Master of Agriculture. He received his Ph.D. in agrochemistry from the University of Minnesota. In mid-1910, he developed a new variety of winter rye, named after him ("Rosen Rye") and widespread in American farms. According to Rosen's project and under his leadership, an agronomic center was created in Minneapolis with a branch in Yekaterinoslav, and later in Kharkov. The purpose of this center was to train agronomists from the Russian Empire in the skills and techniques of highly productive agriculture. In 1915-1918 he was head of the agricultural department in the New York office of the Petrograd International Commercial Bank. He was also head of the agricultural colony of the Jewish Colonisation Association, created by Baron Maurice de Hirsch, in Woodbine (New Jersey).

Beginning in 1921, he was the envoy of Joint in Russia and the representative of Joint in the American Relief Administration; from 1924 to 1938 he was director of the Agro-Joint Corporation, which aimed to transform Soviet Jews, mainly "Lishenets"s, into peasants ... Rosen believed that the secret of a happy future for the Jewish people under Soviet rule was in "productivity", that is, in the transition to productive labor.

Rosen directed a program to relocate Jewish German doctors from Nazi Germany to the USSR. Subsequently, at least 14 of them were repressed by the NKVD, and their families were partially expelled.

During the years of the Great Terror, both of Rosen's deputies for Agro-Joint were arrested — on November 27, 1937 Ezekiel Abramovich Groer (1886—1938), and on March 27, 1938 — Samuil Efimovich Lyubarsky (1878—1938). Their relatives were told that both of them were sentenced to “10 years without the right to correspond”. Rosen decided to take charge. On December 16, 1937, he sent a letter from Paris to the NKVD:

According to the recollections of the daughter of Ezekiel A. Groer, Rosen even managed to meet with Vyacheslav Molotov, but Molotov said that he could not do anything, since Rosen's former Agro-Joint employees had already confessed to everything. In fact, both Groer and Lyubarsky had already been shot (the former on March 15, 1938, the latter on September 1, 1938). In total, during the years of the Stalinist terror, at least 30 employees of Agro-Joint were repressed, and in total 70 people were involved in the Agro-Joint case and all were convicted. Rosen's name has figured in many cases not directly related to Joint. For example, a Moscow rabbi Shmarya Yehuda Leib Medalia was accused of receiving money from Rosen to distribute to the poor. Other members of this Moscow religious community (Meyer L. Rabinovich, Emanuil Ya. Sheptovitsky, et al.) were also accused of distributing this money.

In 1939, Rosen, on behalf of Joint, investigated the possibility of establishing settlements for Jewish refugees from Europe in British Guyana and the Dominican Republic. A street in Santo Domingo is named after Rosen.

Family 
She was a member of the Socialist Revolutionary Party. In 1910 she was deprived of her rights and exiled to Siberia. She fled. She founded the International Book Service in New York and spent 25 years in the book business. In 1933, Katherine N. Rosen published a bibliography of books in English about Russia  (Books in the English Language on Russia).

Sources  
 Краткая еврейская энциклопедия. Т. 7. Кол. 253—254.
 Мицель Михаил. «Последняя глава». Агро-Джойнт в годы большого террора. Киев: Дух и Литера. 2012.
 Розен Джозеф А. // статья из Электронной еврейской энциклопедии
 Guide to the Papers of Joseph A. Rosen (1877—1949), 1911—1943 (bulk 1922—1938)
 Dr. Joseph Rosen, Agro-joint Director Who Resettled 250,000 Jews in Russia, Dies in N. Y.

References

1877 births
1949 deaths
American people of Russian-Jewish descent
American agronomists
University of Minnesota alumni
Mensheviks
Jewish activists
People of the American Relief Administration
Emigrants from the Russian Empire to the United States